Nicesipolis or Nicasipolis of Pherae ( Nikesipolis), was a Thessalian woman, native of the city Pherae, wife or concubine of king Philip II of Macedon and mother of Thessalonica of Macedon. 

There is not much surviving evidence about her background and life but she is likely to have been of noble Thessalian origin and maybe she was a niece of Jason of Pherae. She died 20 days after giving birth to her daughter, Thessalonike of Macedon, circa 345 BCE.

Notes

References
Who's Who in the Age of Alexander the Great by Waldemar Heckel 

340s BC deaths
Ancient Thessalian women
Ancient Thessalians
Ancient Macedonian queens consort
People from Feres
Wives of Philip II of Macedon

See also

Museum of the Royal Tombs of Aigai (Vergina)